Warszawa Wawer railway station is a railway station in the Wawer district of Warsaw, Poland. As of 2012, it is served by Koleje Mazowieckie, which operates the KM7 services from Warszawa Zachodnia to Dęblin), and by Szybka Kolej Miejska, which operates the S1 services from Pruszków PKP to Otwock.

References
Station article at kolej.one.pl

External links 
 

Railway stations in Poland opened in 1877
Wawer
Railway stations in the Russian Empire opened in 1877
Wawer
Railway stations served by Koleje Mazowieckie
Railway stations served by Szybka Kolej Miejska (Warsaw)